Rosebell Kagumire is a Ugandan journalist.

Background and education 
Rosebell Kagumire went to Bwerayangi Girls Secondary School for her secondary school education. She then studied Mass Communication at Makerere University and graduated in 2005. She obtained a certificate in Global Leadership and Public Policy for the 21st Century from the Harvard Kennedy School and a certificate in Nonviolent Conflict at the Fletcher School of Law and Diplomacy, Tufts University. Rosebell holds a Master of Arts in Media, Peace and Conflict Studies from the United Nations-mandated University for Peace in Costa Rica.

Career 
Rosebell Kagumire worked as a reporter for Daily Monitor, Uganda Radio Network and NTV Uganda but while at NTV Uganda, she was in filming, script writing and news story production. Rosebell was a Uganda contributor for the Institute for War and Peace Reporting (IWPR). Kagumire was also a writer at The Independent News magazine. She was the East African Editor for CH16.org, and also a contributor for Inter Press Services. In 2010 she was appointed the Communications Officer for The Women’s International Peace Centre (WIPC). Kagumire also worked as the coordinator for the Africans Act for Africa (AA4A). She then went on to work as the Communications Consultant for the Institute for Peace and Security Studies, Addis Ababa University developing a communications and media strategy for the Tana High Level Forum on Security in Africa hosted in Ethiopia. Rosebell Kagumire was the Social Media manager and then the Public Information Officer for the International Organization for Migration (IOM). In 2013 to 2016, she worked as Least Developed Countries Independent Expert Group for the International Institute for Environment and Development. She was the communications officer for the Women's Link Worldwide. Rosebell Kagumire is the curator and editor of African Feminism- AF, a platform that documents experiences of African women. She also serves as the Collaborator Global Reporting Centre and also as a Freelance Editor and Writer whose work appears in international media such as The Guardian, Al Jazeera and Quartz. Rosebell Kagumire is Volunteering Author for the Global Voices. She is a member of the advisory council of the Europe-based Centre for Feminist Foreign Policy, a research, advocacy, and consulting organization dedicated to promoting feminist foreign policy across the globe.

Awards 
Rosebell Kagumire was honored with the Anna Guèye 2018 award for her advocacy for digital democracy, justice and equality by Africtivistes, a network of African activists. The World Economic Forum recognized her as one of the Young Global Leaders under the age of 40 in 2013 for her advocacy on social justice issues. In 2012 she was named as one of Foreign Policy Magazine’s “100 women to follow on Twitter”. Her blog won the Waxal – Blogging Africa Awards, first African journalist blogging awards hosted by Panos Institute of West Africa in 2009.  Kagumire's reporting on peace and security was recognized at the 2008 Ugandan Investigative Journalism Awards hosted by Makerere University Department of Mass Communication.

See also 
Kony 2012

African feminism

References

External links 
 https://africanfeminism.com/author/rosebell/
 https://rosebellkagumire.com/about/
 https://muckrack.com/rosebell-kagumire

Ugandan journalists
Ugandan radio journalists
Ugandan television journalists
Ugandan women journalists
Ugandan women radio journalists
Ugandan television presenters
Ugandan women television journalists
Ugandan radio presenters
Ugandan women radio presenters
Ugandan women television presenters
Living people
Ugandan feminists
Year of birth missing (living people)

Ugandan activists